Civic Trust may refer to:

 Civic Trust (England), now defunct; functions taken over by Civic Voice
 Gloucester Civic Trust
 Swindon Civic Trust
 Civic Trust for Wales, now dormant
 Scottish Civic Trust

See also

 Civic society
 Civic Trust Awards
 Cockburn Association
 Heritage Open Days
 Nagpur Improvement Trust